Li'l Abner is a 1940 film based on the comic strip Li'l Abner created by Al Capp. The three most recognizable names associated with the film are Buster Keaton as Lonesome Polecat, Jeff York as Li'l Abner, and Milton Berle, who co-wrote the title song.

This was the first of two films based on the popular Al Capp strip, the second being Paramount's 1959 musical, Li'l Abner, which was also based on the hit 1956 Broadway musical Li'l Abner.

The film was poorly received, with the rubber "facial appliances" worn by some of the characters to simulate Capp's character designs being especially deficient.

Plot
Li'l Abner becomes convinced that he is going to die within twenty-four hours, so agrees to marry two different girls: Daisy Mae (who has chased him for years) and Wendy Wilecat (who rescued him from an angry mob). It is all settled at the Sadie Hawkins Day race.

Cast
 Li'l Abner Yokum played by Jeff York (as Granville Owen)
 Daisy Mae Scraggs played by Martha O'Driscoll
 Pansy "Mammy" Yokum played by Mona Ray
 Lucifer "Pappy" Yokum played by Johnnie Morris
 Lonesome Polecat played by Buster Keaton
 Cousin Delightful played by Billie Seward
 Wendy Wilecat played by Kay Sutton
 Granny Scraggs played by Maude Eburne
 Hairless Jo' played by Bud Jamison
 Cornelius Cornpone played by Edgar Kennedy
 Montague  played by Johnny Arthur
 Barber played by Walter Catlett
 The Sheriff / Mr. Oldtimer played by Lucien Littlefield
 Earthquake McGoon played by Charles A. Post
 Hairless Joe played by Bud Jamison
 Mayor Gurgle played by Chester Conklin
 Marryin' Sam  played by Dick Elliott
 Cicero Grunts played by Mickey Daniels
 Hannibal Hoops played by Doodles Weaver
 Miss Lulubell played by Marie Blake
 Sarah Jones played by Rene Riano
 Joe Smithpan played by Al St. John
 Barney Bargrease played by Eddie Gribbon
 Bachelor, Sadies Hawkins Day Race played by Hank Mann
 Bachelor played by Eddie Borden
 Fantastic Brown played by Victor Potel
 Undetermined Role played by Louise Keaton

See also
 Dogpatch
 Dogpatch USA
 Salomey

References

External links
 
 
 

1940 films
Li'l Abner
1940 comedy films
Films based on American comics
Films based on comic strips
Live-action films based on comics
RKO Pictures films
American comedy films
American black-and-white films
1940s English-language films
Films directed by Albert S. Rogell
1940s American films